Pointing and calling is a method in occupational safety for avoiding mistakes by pointing at important indicators and verbally calling out their status. It is particularly common on Japanese railways, where it is referred to as shisa kanko, shisa kakunin kanko or yubisashi koshō; and in Chinese railways, where it is called "". Gesturing at and verbalizing these indicators helps with focus. The method was first used by train drivers and is now commonly used in Japanese industry. It is not common in other countries, though it is used in the New York City Subway system, Toronto's TTC subway and GO Transit and many systems built in Chinese standards, for example Addis Ababa-Djibouti Railway.

Pointing and calling requires co-action and co-reaction among the operator's brain, eyes, hands, mouth, and ears.

History 
The method originated in Japan in the early 1900s, with train drivers calling out the status of signals. Back in those days steam locomotives were common in use, with loud noises, steam and smoke making the cooperation between the two drivers difficult, and also making rail journeys dangerous. Drivers had to call out loudly to hear each other. The pointing was added a few decades later. During the Japanese occupation of China and the South Manchuria Railway's operation, the system was introduced to China, which slightly changed to fit the Chinese Railway system.

Asia 
The method is widely used in East Asia countries, especially in dangerous works such as elevator maintenance and railway operations. The Chinese variant became much more complex including pointing (using both forefinger and middle finger instead of forefinger only in Japan, used when checking signals, doors, speed and other major aspects) and caution (bending the right elbow by 90° and lifting the forearm upright, used when a checking procedure is finished or caution signals).

The method is also used in Indonesia by national rail operator Kereta Api Indonesia and its subsidiary (KAI Commuter and KAI Bandara) following the company's reform in 2015, and also by newer regional rail operators such as Jakarta MRT and Jakarta LRT.

In Japan the pointing and calling has become a part of the railway culture, and is featured in many events like the opening of a new railway company, such as the departing ceremony of Osaka Metro.

North America 
In North America, transit workers perform a similar procedure, known as "point and acknowledge".

New York City 

In the MTA, before opening the train doors, subway conductors are required to point to a black-and-white striped board located opposite of the conductor's window every time when a train pulls into a station. The boards are located at the middle of the platform such that when the conductor can see the sign, both ends of the train have reached the platform and that it is safe to open the train doors. The procedure was implemented in 1996 after a series of incidents where doors opened in the tunnel. The procedure shows that the conductor is paying attention. If the conductor cannot see the striped board, they are not permitted to open the doors.

Toronto 
In the TTC, before opening the train doors, subway guards are required to point to a green triangle installed on the platform wall opposite of the conductor's window every time when a train pulls into a station. The procedure was implemented after a series of incidents where conductors opened the doors on the wrong side of the train. The procedure is used to focus the conductor's attention.

Streetcar operators are required to confirm track switch alignments by stopping at a switch, pointing to the switch with their index finger, and then proceeding. This is done to focus the operator's attention to ensure that the streetcar does not go to a different route.

GO Transit adopted the practice in March 2021. Upon entering a station, but before opening the doors, the Customer Service Ambassador (CSA) is required to point towards both ends of the train and announce that the platform is clear as a way to confirm that the train is stopped properly. After the CSA closes the doors, the same process is repeated to confirm that nobody is caught in the doors. According to Metrolinx, incorporating the pointing and calling procedure within GO Transit's daily operations is an important way to enhance safety, "especially as the transit agency gets ready to launch the largest expansion of GO service in  history".

Effectiveness 
A 1994 study by the Railway Technical Research Institute showed that pointing and calling reduced mistakes by almost 85 percent when doing a simple task.

References

Further reading 
 "田辺肇 "危険予知活動実践マニュアル" 1984, Japan Industrial Safety and Health Association
 "今村一郎 "機関車と共に" 1962、ヘッドライト社, page 78
 "神戸鉄道管理局 "機関車乗務員教範" 1913年, pages 259-262
 
"Railway Management Regulations(铁路技术管理规程)" 1992, China Railways

External links 

 
 
 
 

Occupational safety and health
Railway safety
Railway culture in Japan
Attention